The Tocheichah or Tochacha, meaning admonition or reproof, is the section in chapter 26 of Leviticus which highlights the consequence of a failure by the people of Israel to follow God's laws and keep his commandments. It forms part of the parashah Bechukotai, the final portion of Leviticus. It is distinguished from the preceding section, which relates to God's blessings which will be bestowed if the people of Israel do walk in God's ways and keep his commandments.

 has a similar series of curses proclaimed by Moses as the consequence of a failure by his people to follow God's laws and keep his commandments.

Because of the distressing nature of the admonitions - terror, disease, warfare, famine and desolation - this section is traditionally read in a low voice in synagogue readings (but loud enough to be audible to the congregation)  The Kitzur Shulchan Aruch of Rabbi Shlomo Ganzfried prescribed that the Tocheichah must always be read without a break, and that three verses before the admonitions and three verses after the admonitions, read in a normal, fully audible voice, must always be included in the reading. Thus the admonitions would always be accompanied by the message that God would remember his covenant with Abraham, Isaac and Jacob.

References

Weekly Torah readings
Book of Leviticus